Holdcroft is an unincorporated community in Charles City County, Virginia, United States. Capital Airlines Flight 20 crashed in Holdcroft on January 18, 1960.

Piney Grove was added to the National Register of Historic Places in 1985.

References

Unincorporated communities in Virginia
Unincorporated communities in Charles City County, Virginia